"All My Life" is a single released by Billy Joel, the first new song of original material with lyrics he had written since 1993's River of Dreams album. The song, produced by Phil Ramone, was written in honor of the second anniversary of Joel and his wife Katie Lee.

Japan B-sides
In addition to "You're My Home", the Japanese-only physical CD single release includes two more live tracks, "Honesty" and "Stiletto". All three tracks were recorded in 2006 during the series of 12 sold-out concerts in New York City's Madison Square Garden which yielded the 12 Gardens Live album, but were not originally included in that album. In those performances, "Honesty" and many other Joel hits were transposed into lower keys than the original album versions; "Honesty" was moved a half-step lower, from the key of B-flat major to the key of A major.

The Japanese release also includes a booklet with English lyrics and Japanese translations for all four songs.

Chart positions

References

2007 singles
Billy Joel songs
Songs written by Billy Joel
Song recordings produced by Phil Ramone
2007 songs